St. John the Evangelist Church refers to churches honoring John the Apostle, also known as John the Divine or John of Patmos,  as their patron saint but distinguished from John the Baptist. Thus, the designation may refer to:

Australia

 St John the Evangelist Church, Wallerawang, in New South Wales
 St John the Evangelist Church, Wollombi, in New South Wales
 St John's Cathedral, Brisbane, in Queensland
 St John's Anglican Church, Albany, in Western Australia
 St John's Anglican Church, Fremantle, in Western Australia
 St John's the Evangelist Church, Greenwood, in Western Australia

Canada
 Anglican Church of St. John the Evangelist (Ottawa)
 Church of St John the Evangelist (Montreal)
 St. John the Evangelist Anglican Church (Foam Lake)
 St. John the Evangelist Anglican Church (Peterborough, Ontario)
 Cathedral Church of St. John the Evangelist, Corner Brook NL

China
 St John's Church, Chengdu

Hong Kong
 St. John's Cathedral, Hong Kong, The Cathedral Church of St. John the Evangelist

India
 Afghan Church, the Church of St John the Evangelist, South Mumbai
 St. John's Orthodox Syrian Church, Thuvayoor, Pathanamthitta, Kerala

Ireland
 Church of St. John the Evangelist, Dublin

Italy
San Giovanni in Monte, Bologna
San Giovanni Evangelista, Parma
San Giovanni Evangelista, Ravenna

Malta
St John's Chapel, Ħal Millieri

Poland
 St. John's Evangelist Church (Pińczów)

Russia
St. John the Evangelist Church (Grushevskaya)

United Kingdom

England
 St John the Evangelist Church, Banbury, Oxfordshire
 St John's Church, Bath (St. John the Evangelist R.C. Church)
 St John's Church, Blackpool (Church of Saint John the Evangelist)
 The chapel of St John's College, Cambridge and numerous other similar chapels
 Church of St. John the Evangelist, Carrington
 Church of St John the Evangelist, Havering-atte-Bower
 St John the Evangelist Church, Heron's Ghyll, East Sussex
 Church of St. John the Evangelist, Hucknall
 St John the Divine, Kennington, London
 St. John's Church, Ladywood (The Church of St. John the Evangelist and St. Peter)
 Church of St John the Evangelist, Milborne Port
 St John the Evangelist Church, Oxford
 St John the Evangelist, Palmers Green, London
 Cathedral of St John the Evangelist, Portsmouth
 Church of St John the Evangelist, Poulton-le-Fylde
 St John the Divine, Richmond, London
 St John The Evangelist Church, Ridgeway
 Salford Cathedral, the Cathedral Church of St. John the Evangelist, Salford
 Church of St. John the Evangelist, Sandown, Isle of Wight
 St John the Evangelist, Upper Norwood, London
 Church of St John the Evangelist, Warminster, Wiltshire
 St John the Evangelist Church, Woodley
 St John the Evangelist Church, Fareham

Scotland
Church of St John the Evangelist, Aberdeen
Church of St John the Evangelist, Edinburgh
Church of St John the Evangelist, Wick

Wales
Brecon Cathedral - Cathedral Church of St John the Evangelist

United States

California
 Episcopal Church of St. John the Evangelist, San Francisco

Florida
 St. John the Evangelist Catholic Community, Viera

Indiana
St. John the Evangelist Catholic Church (Indianapolis), on the National Register of Historic Places

Massachusetts
 St. John the Evangelist Church (Cambridge, Massachusetts)
 St. John the Evangelist Roman Catholic Church (Attleboro)
 St. John the Evangelist Roman Catholic Church (Hopkinton)

Maryland
 St. John the Evangelist Roman Catholic Church (Baltimore, Maryland), on the National Register of Historic Places
 St. John the Evangelist Catholic Church (Silver Spring, Maryland)
 St. John the Evangelist Catholic Church (Frederick, Maryland)

Michigan
 St. John the Evangelist Catholic Church, Ishpeming, Michigan
 St. John the Evangelist Catholic Church, Fenton, Michigan
 St. John the Evangelist Catholic Church, Davison, Michigan

Minnesota
 St. John the Evangelist (Rochester, Minnesota)

New Jersey
 The Greek Orthodox Metropolitan Cathedral Of St. John The Theologian, Tenafly, New Jersey

New York
 Cathedral of St. John the Divine (New York City)
 Church of St. John the Evangelist (Hunter, New York)
 Church of St. John the Evangelist (Stockport, New York) (NRHP)

Ohio
 Cathedral of St. John the Evangelist (Cleveland, Ohio)

Oregon
St. John the Evangelist Roman Catholic Church (Zigzag, Oregon) (NRHP)

See also
 St John the Evangelist's Church (disambiguation)